"Sympathy for the Devil" is a song by English rock band the Rolling Stones and the opening track from the band's 1968 album Beggars Banquet. The song is a product of Mick Jagger and Keith Richards' songwriting partnership.

It is considered one of the best songs of the popular music era, and has been included on multiple "best of" lists, such as 106th on Rolling Stones 500 Greatest Songs of All Time. It is also the 22nd best ranked song on critics' all-time lists according to Acclaimed Music.

Inspiration 
"Sympathy for the Devil" is credited to Jagger and Richards, though the song was largely a Jagger composition. The working title of the song was "The Devil Is My Name", having earlier been called "Fallen Angels". Jagger sings in first person narrative as the Devil, who boasts of his role in each of several historical atrocities and repeatedly asks the listener to "guess my name." The singer then ironically demands the listener's courtesy towards him, implicitly chastising the listeners for their collective culpability in the listed killings and crimes. In the 2012 documentary Crossfire Hurricane, Jagger stated that his influence for the song came from Baudelaire and from the Russian author Mikhail Bulgakov's novel The Master and Margarita (which had just appeared in English translation in 1967). The book was given to Jagger by Marianne Faithfull and she confirmed the inspiration in an interview with Sylvie Simmons for the magazine Mojo in 2005.

In a 1995 interview with Rolling Stone, Jagger said, "that was taken from an old idea of Baudelaire's, I think, but I could be wrong. Sometimes when I look at my Baudelaire books, I can't see it in there. But it was an idea I got from French writing. And I just took a couple of lines and expanded on it. I wrote it as sort of like a Bob Dylan song." It was Richards who suggested changing the tempo and using additional percussion, turning the folk song into a samba.

Furthermore, Jagger stated in the Rolling Stone interview: "it's a very long historical figure — the figures of evil and figures of good — so it is a tremendously long trail he's made as personified in this piece." By the time Beggars Banquet was released, the Rolling Stones had already caused controversy for sexually forward lyrics such as "Let's Spend the Night Together", and their cover of the Willie Dixon's blues "I Just Want to Make Love to You" etc. There were also claims they had dabbled in Satanism (their previous album, while containing no direct Satanic references in its music or lyrics, was titled Their Satanic Majesties Request). "Sympathy" brought these concerns to the fore, provoking media rumours and fears among some religious groups that the Stones were devil worshippers and a corrupting influence on youth.

The lyrics focus on atrocities in mankind's history from Satan's point of view, including the trial and death of Jesus Christ ("Made damn sure that Pilate washed his hands to seal his fate"), European wars of religion ("I watched with glee while your kings and queens fought for ten decades for the gods they made"), the violence of the Russian Revolution of 1917 and the 1918 execution of the Romanov family during World War I ("I stuck around St. Petersburg when I saw it was a time for a change/Killed the Tsar and his ministers/Anastasia screamed in vain"), and World War II ("I rode a tank, held a general's rank when the blitzkrieg raged, and the bodies stank"). The song was originally written with the line "I shouted out 'Who killed Kennedy?'" After Robert F. Kennedy's death on 6 June 1968, the line was changed to "Who killed the Kennedys?".

The song may have been spared further controversy when the first single from the same album, "Street Fighting Man", became even more controversial in view of the race riots and student protests occurring in many cities in Europe and in the United States.

Recording 
The recording of "Sympathy for the Devil" began at London's Olympic Sound Studios on 4 June 1968; overdubs were done on 8, 9 and 10 June. Personnel included on the recording include Nicky Hopkins on piano, Rocky Dijon on congas and Bill Wyman on shekere. Marianne Faithfull, Anita Pallenberg, Brian Jones, Charlie Watts, producer Jimmy Miller, Wyman, and Richards performed backup vocals, singing the "woo woos". Richards plays bass on the original recording, and also electric guitar. Brian Jones plays a mostly mixed out acoustic guitar, although in isolated tracks of the studio cut, it is audible playing along with the piano.

In the 2003 book According to the Rolling Stones, Watts commented:

On the overall power of the song, Jagger continued in Rolling Stone:

The backing "who who-woo-woo' vocals, which helped to make the song's sound stand out, came about by accident thanks to Jimmy Miller and Anita Pallenberg. Pallenberg was in the engineering booth with Miller while Jagger was belting out an early vocal take of the song. According to Pallenberg, Miller was half talking to himself as Jagger sang, saying stuff like "Come on Mick, give it your all, who are you singing about? – Who, who?" He then repeated "Who who" several times after that as Jagger sang on, and Pallenberg realised how wonderful that all sounded. After the take, she told Jagger what transpired in the booth and suggested that "who who" be used in the song as a backing vocal chant. The Stones then gave it a go and after the first take, "Who who" became "woo-woo", with most of this caught on film by director Jean-Luc Godard for his One Plus One (aka Sympathy for the Devil) movie.

Aftermath 
In an interview with Creem, Jagger said, "[When people started taking us as devil worshippers], I thought it was a really odd thing, because it was only one song, after all. It wasn't like it was a whole album, with lots of occult signs on the back. People seemed to embrace the image so readily, [and] it has carried all the way over into heavy metal bands today. Some people have made a living out of doing this; for example, Jimmy Page."

Of the change in public perception the band experienced after the song's release, Richards said in a 1971 interview with Rolling Stone, "Before, we were just innocent kids out for a good time, they're saying, 'They're evil, they're evil.' Oh, I'm evil, really? So that makes you start thinking about evil ... What is evil? Half of it, I don't know how many people think of Mick as the devil or as just a good rock performer or what? There are black magicians who think we are acting as unknown agents of Lucifer and others who think we are Lucifer. Everybody's Lucifer."

Hunter S. Thompson and his attorney Oscar Zeta Acosta kept replaying the song hundreds of times during their drug-induced Chevy ride to Las Vegas in 1971 to maintain focus whilst high on class A drugs. In Thompson's novel, Fear and Loathing in Las Vegas and the film of the same name, the song is referenced several times.

Contrary to a widespread misconception, it was "Under My Thumb" and not "Sympathy for the Devil" that the Stones were performing when Meredith Hunter was killed at the Altamont Free Concert. Rolling Stone magazine's early articles on the incident typically misreported that the killing took place during "Sympathy for the Devil", but the Stones in fact played "Sympathy for the Devil" earlier in the concert; it was interrupted by a fight and restarted, Jagger commenting, "We're always having—something very funny happens when we start that number." Several other songs were performed before Hunter was killed.

Personnel 
According to authors Philippe Margotin and Jean-Michel Guesdon, except where noted:

 The Rolling Stones 
Mick Jagger lead vocal, hand drum
Keith Richards backing vocals, lead guitar, bass
Brian Jones backing vocals, acoustic guitar (inaudible)
Bill Wyman backing vocals, shekere
Charlie Watts backing vocals, drums

 Additional personnel 
Unidentified musician maracas
Nicky Hopkins backing vocals, piano
Rocky Dzidzornu congas, cowbell
Anita Pallenberg, Marianne Faithfull backing vocals

Certifications

The 1968 film and others 

Sympathy for the Devil is also the title of a producer's edit of a 1968 film by Jean-Luc Godard whose own original version is called One Plus One. The film, a depiction of the late 1960s American counterculture, also featured the Rolling Stones in the process of recording the song in the studio. On the filming, Jagger said in Rolling Stone: "[it was] very fortuitous, because Godard wanted to do a film of us in the studio. I mean, it would never happen now, to get someone as interesting as Godard. And stuffy. We just happened to be recording that song. We could have been recording "My Obsession". But it was "Sympathy for the Devil", and it became the track that we used."

During the several days of recording the Stones as they played, a film lamp set up by Godard's crew started a major fire in the studio that caused substantial damage to the studio and laid waste to some of the band's equipment. However, the song's tapes were saved by producer Jimmy Miller before he fled the studio, and Godard kept his cameras rolling capturing the fire on film as it roared on.

Guns N' Roses version 

Guns N' Roses recorded a cover in 1994 which reached number 55 on the Billboard Hot 100; it was featured in the closing credits of Neil Jordan's film adaptation of Anne Rice's Interview with the Vampire  and was included on their Greatest Hits album. This cover is noteworthy for causing an incident involving incoming guitarist Paul "Huge" Tobias, that was partially responsible for guitarist Slash departing from the band in 1996. Slash has described the Guns N' Roses version of the song as "the sound of the band breaking up".

Rhythm guitarist Gilby Clarke, who does not appear on the recording, noted that the recording foreshadowed his departure from the band: 

This was the band's final single until 2021's "Absurd" to feature guitarist Slash and bassist Duff McKagan.

Personnel 
W. Axl Roselead vocals, piano
Slashlead and rhythm guitars
Duff McKaganbass, backing vocals
Matt Sorumdrums, percussion
Dizzy Reedkeyboards
Paul Hugerhythm and lead guitars, backing vocals

Charts

Weekly charts

Year-end charts

Sales and certifications

Notes

References

Sources

External links

"Reason to Rock" review

1968 songs
Cultural depictions of Grand Duchess Anastasia Nikolaevna of Russia
The Rolling Stones songs
Songs written by Jagger–Richards
Song recordings produced by Jimmy Miller
Music based on the Faust legend
1973 singles
1994 singles
2003 singles
Guns N' Roses songs
Decca Records singles
Geffen Records singles
London Records singles
Obscenity controversies in music
Cultural depictions of Jesus